Yelimbetovo (Yälembät) is a rural locality (a village) in Tashtimerovsky Selsoviet, Abzelilovsky District, Bashkortostan, Russia. The population was 371 as of 2010. There are 5 streets.

Geography 
Yelimbetovo is located 26 km northeast of Askarovo (the district's administrative centre) by road. Tashtimerovo is the nearest rural locality.

References 

Rural localities in Abzelilovsky District